The West Memphis Commercial Historic District encompasses the largest concentration of historic commercial buildings in the central business district of West Memphis, Arkansas.  The district extends along East Broadway (United States Route 70) between 7th and 10th Streets, and includes 22 historic buildings.  Most of these buildings were built between 1930 and 1950, and are typically single-story brick buildings with vernacular commercial design.  A number of the buildings have modest Art Deco features, such as the cornice at 801 East Broadway.

The district was listed on the National Register of Historic Places in 2008.

See also
National Register of Historic Places listings in Crittenden County, Arkansas

References

Historic districts on the National Register of Historic Places in Arkansas
Buildings designated early commercial in the National Register of Historic Places
Art Deco architecture in Arkansas
Buildings and structures completed in 1930
Geography of Crittenden County, Arkansas
National Register of Historic Places in Crittenden County, Arkansas
West Memphis, Arkansas